Syeda Wahida Sabrina (born 11 September 2000) is a Bangladeshi film actress. She has won the Bangladesh National Film Award for Best Child Artist twice, for the films Gangajatra (2009) and Antardhan (2012). Apart from continuing her work as an actor, she has also written the subtitles for films such as Antardhan (2012), Shesh Kotha (2017) and Rohingya (Soon to be released). She has also assisted in various films and dramas, and continues to have an avid interest in filmmaking and linguistics.

Selected films
 Gangajatra - 2009
 Antardhan - 2012
 Shesh Kotha - 2017
 Rohingya - (Soon to be released)

Television 
Syeda Wahida Sabrina has worked in the drama 'Agnidan' directed by Syed Wahiduzzaman Diamond, starring Sumona Shoma as the lead role which was aired in 2008.

Awards and nominations
National Film Awards

References

External links
 

Living people
Bangladeshi film actors
Best Child Artist National Film Award (Bangladesh) winners
2000 births